Echinosepala tomentosa is a species of orchid plant native to Costa Rica.

References 

tomentosa
Flora of Costa Rica